Górskie may refer to the following places:
Górskie, Augustów County in Podlaskie Voivodeship (north-east Poland)
Górskie, Bielsk County in Podlaskie Voivodeship (north-east Poland)
Górskie, Kolno County in Podlaskie Voivodeship (north-east Poland)